Filip Pijevac (born 2 May 1990) is a Serbian football goalkeeper who plays for FAP.

References

External links
 
 Filip Pjevac stats at utakmica.rs 
 

1990 births
Living people
People from Priboj
Association football goalkeepers
Serbian footballers
FK Borac Čačak players
FK FAP players
FK Polet Ljubić players
Serbian SuperLiga players
FK Sileks players